Halldór Kiljan Laxness (born Halldór Guðjónsson; 23 April 1902 – 8 February 1998) was an Icelandic writer and winner of the 1955 Nobel Prize in Literature. He wrote novels, poetry, newspaper articles, essays, plays, travelogues and short stories. Writers who influenced Laxness included August Strindberg, Sigmund Freud, Knut Hamsun, Sinclair Lewis, Upton Sinclair, Bertolt Brecht and Ernest Hemingway.

Early years
Halldór Guðjónsson was born in Reykjavík in 1902.  When he was three his family moved to the Laxnes farm in Mosfellssveit parish. He was brought up and enormously influenced by his grandmother who "... sang me ancient songs before I could talk, told me stories from heathen times and sang me cradle songs from the Catholic era... " He started to read books and write stories at an early age and attended the technical school in Reykjavík from 1915 to 1916. His earliest published writing appeared in 1916 in the children's newspapers Æskan and Sólskin, the latter being a part of the North American Icelandic newspaper Lögberg, as well as in Morgunblaðið. Laxness then attended and graduated from the Reykjavík Lyceum in the spring of 1918. By the time his first novel, Barn náttúrunnar (Child of Nature), was published in 1919, he had already begun his travels on the European continent.

1920s
In 1922, Halldór joined the Abbaye Saint-Maurice et Saint-Maur in Clervaux, Luxembourg, where the monks followed the rules of Saint Benedict of Nursia. In 1923 he was baptized and confirmed in the Catholic Church, adopting the surname Laxness after the homestead on which he was raised and adding the name Kiljan (the Icelandic name of Irish martyr Saint Killian); Laxness practiced self-study, read books, and studied French, Latin, theology and philosophy. He became a member of a group that prayed for reversion of the Nordic countries to Catholicism. Laxness wrote of his experiences in the essay Kaþólsk viðhorf (1925),  and the novels Undir Helgahnúk (1924) and Vefarinn mikli frá Kasmír (1927), the latter book hailed by noted Icelandic critic Kristján Albertsson: 
"Finally, finally, a grand novel which towers like a cliff above the flatland of contemporary Icelandic poetry and fiction! Iceland has gained a new literary giant - it is our duty to celebrate the fact with joy!" 
Laxness's religious period did not last long. He lived in the United States from 1927 to 1929, giving lectures on Iceland and attempting to write screenplays for Hollywood films. During this time he became attracted to socialism:

"…(Laxness) did not become a socialist in America from studying manuals of socialism but from watching the starving unemployed in the parks."Laxness, Halldór,Alþýðubókin, Þriðja útgáfa (3rd edition), (Reykjavík, 1949), p.9

"… Laxness joined the socialist bandwagon… with a book Alþýðubókin (The Book of the People, 1929) of brilliant burlesque and satirical essays… "

"Beside the fundamental idea of socialism, the strong sense of Icelandic individuality is also the sustaining element in Alþýðubókin. The two elements are entwined together in characteristic fashion and in their very union give the work its individual character."

In 1929 Laxness published an article critical of the United States in Heimskringla, a Canadian newspaper. This resulted in charges being filed against him, his detention and the forfeiture of his passport. With the aid of Upton Sinclair and the ACLU, the charges were dropped and Laxness returned to Iceland.

1930s
By the 1930s Laxness "had become the apostle of the younger generation" of Icelandic writers.
"… Salka Valka (1931–32) began the great series of sociological novels, often coloured with socialist ideas, continuing almost without a break for nearly twenty years. This was probably the most brilliant period of his career, and it is the one which produced those of his works that have become most famous. But Laxness never attached himself permanently to a particular dogma." In addition to the two parts of Salka Valka, Laxness published Fótatak manna (Steps of Men) in 1933, a collection of short stories, as well as other essays, notably Dagleið á fjöllum (A Day's Journey in the Mountains) in 1937.

Laxness's next novel was Sjálfstætt fólk (Independent People (1934 and 1935), which has been described as "… one of the best books of the twentieth century."

When Salka Valka was published in English in 1936 a reviewer on the Evening Standard stated: "No beauty is allowed to exist as ornamentation in its own right in these pages; but the work is replete from cover to cover with the beauty of its perfection."

In 1937 Laxness wrote the poem Maístjarnan (The May Star), which was set to music by Jón Ásgeirsson and has become a socialist anthem.

This was followed by the four-part novel Heimsljós (World Light, 1937, 1938, 1939 and 1940), which is loosely based on the life of Magnús Hjaltason Magnusson, a minor Icelandic poet of the late 19th century. It has been "… consistently regarded by many critics as his most important work."

Laxness also traveled to the Soviet Union in 1938 and wrote approvingly of the Soviet system and culture. He was present at the "Trial of the Twenty-one" and wrote about it in detail in his book Gerska æfintýrið (The Russian Adventure). 

In the late 1930s Laxness developed a unique spelling system that was closer to pronunciation than standard Icelandic. This characteristic of his writing is lost in translation.

1940s
In 1941 Laxness translated Ernest Hemingway's A Farewell to Arms into Icelandic, which caused controversy because of his use of neologisms. He continued to court controversy over the next few years  through the publication of new editions of several Icelandic sagas using modern Icelandic rather than the normalized Old Norse orthography, which had become customary. Laxness and his publishing partners were taken to court following the publication of his edition of Hrafnkels saga in 1942. They were found guilty of violating a recent copyright law, but eventually they were acquitted of the charge when the copyright law was deemed a violation to the freedom of the press.

Laxness's "epic" three-part work of historical fiction, Íslandsklukkan (Iceland's Bell), was published between 1943 and 1946. It has been described as a novel of broad "… geographical and political scope… expressly concerned with national identity and the role literature plays in forming it… a tale of colonial exploitation and the obdurate will of a suffering people." "Halldór Kiljan Laxness’s three-volume Íslandsklukkan … is probably the most significant (Icelandic) novel of the 1940s."

In 1946 the English translation of Independent People was published as a Book of the Month Club selection in the United States, selling over 450,000 copies.

In 1945 Halldór and his second wife, Auður Sveinsdóttir, moved into Gljúfrasteinn, a new house built in the countryside near Mosfellsbær, where they began a new family.  Auður, in addition to her domestic duties, also assumed the roles of personal secretary and business manager.

In response to the establishment of a permanent U.S. military base in Keflavík, he wrote the satire Atómstöðin (The Atom Station), which may have contributed to a blacklisting of his novels in the United States."The demoralization of the occupation period is described ... nowhere as dramatically as in Halldór Kiljan Laxness' Atómstöðin (1948)... [where he portrays] postwar society in Reykjavík, completely torn from its moorings by the avalanche of foreign gold."
Due to its examination of modern Reykjavík, Atómstöðin caused many critics and readers to consider it as the exemplary "Reykjavík Novel."

1950s

In 1952 Laxness was awarded the Stalin Peace Prize (later renamed the Lenin Peace Prize) and in 1953 he was awarded the Soviet-sponsored World Peace Council literary Prize.

A Swedish film adaptation of his novel Salka Valka, directed by Arne Mattsson and filmed by Sven Nykvist, was released in 1954.

In 1955 Laxness was awarded the Nobel Prize in Literature, "… for his vivid epic power, which has renewed the great narrative art of Iceland".

"His chief literary works belong to the genre… [of] narrative prose fiction. In the history of our literature Laxness is mentioned beside Snorri Sturluson, the author of "Njals saga", and his place in world literature is among writers such as Cervantes, Zola, Tolstoy, and Hamsun… He is the most prolific and skillful essayist in Icelandic literature both old and new…"

In the presentation address for the Nobel prize Elias Wessén stated:"He is an excellent painter of Icelandic scenery and settings. Yet this is not what he has conceived of as his chief mission. 'Compassion is the source of the highest poetry. Compassion with Asta Sollilja on earth,' he says in one of his best books… And a social passion underlies everything Halldór Laxness has written. His personal championship of contemporary social and political questions is always very strong, sometimes so strong that it threatens to hamper the artistic side of his work. His safeguard then is the astringent humour which enables him to see even people he dislikes in a redeeming light, and which also permits him to gaze far down into the labyrinths of the human soul."

In his acceptance speech for the Nobel Prize Laxness spoke of:"… the moral principles she [his grandmother] instilled in me: never to harm a living creature; throughout my life, to place the poor, the humble, the meek of this world above all others; never to forget those who were slighted or neglected or who had suffered injustice, because it was they who, above all others, deserved our love and respect…"
Laxness grew increasingly disenchanted with the Soviet bloc after the suppression of the Hungarian Revolution of 1956.

In 1957 Halldór and his wife went on a world tour, stopping in New York City, Washington, DC, Chicago, Madison, Salt Lake City, San Francisco, Peking (Beijing), Bombay (Mumbai), Cairo and Rome.

Major works in this decade were Gerpla, (The Happy Warriors/Wayward Heroes, 1952), Brekkukotsannáll, (The Fish Can Sing, 1957), and  Paradísarheimt, (Paradise Reclaimed, 1960).

Later years
In the 1960s Laxness was very active in Icelandic theater. He wrote and produced plays, the most successful of which was The Pigeon Banquet (Dúfnaveislan, 1966.)

In 1968 Laxness published the "visionary novel" Kristnihald undir Jökli (Under the Glacier / Christianity at the Glacier). In the 1970s he published what he called "essay novels": Innansveitarkronika (A Parish Chronicle, 1970) and Guðsgjafaþula (A Narration of God's Gifts, 1972). Neither has been translated into English.

Laxness was awarded the Sonning Prize in 1969.

In 1970 Laxness published an influential ecological essay, Hernaðurinn gegn landinu (The War Against the Land).

He continued to write essays and memoirs throughout the 1970s and into the 1980s. As he grew older he began to suffer from Alzheimer's disease and eventually moved into a nursing home, where he died on 8 February 1998, at the age of 95.

Family and legacy

Laxness married to Ingibjörg Einarsdóttir (3 May 1908 - 22 January 1994) in 1930 (divorced in 1940), and married Auður Sveinsdóttir (30 June 1918 - 29 October 2012) in 1945.

He had four children: Sigríður Mária Elísabet Halldórsdóttir (Maria, 10 April 1923 - 19 March 2016), Einar Laxness (9 August 1931 - 23 May 2016), Sigríður Halldórsdóttir (Sigga, b. 26 May 1951) and Guðný Halldórsdóttir (Duna, b. 23 January 1954). Guðný Halldórsdóttir is a filmmaker whose first work was the 1989 adaptation of Kristnihald undir jōkli (Under the Glacier). In 1999 her adaptation of her father's story Úngfrúin góða og Húsið (The Honour of the House) was submitted for consideration for the Academy Award for Best Foreign Film. Guðný's son, Halldór Laxness Halldórsson, is a writer, actor and poet.
Another grandchild, Auður Jónsdóttir, is an author and playwright.
Gljúfrasteinn (Laxness's house, grounds and personal effects) is now a museum operated by the Icelandic government.

In the 21st century interest in Laxness in English-speaking countries has increased following the reissue of several of his novels and the first English-language publications of Iceland's Bell (2003) and The Great Weaver from Kashmir (2008). In 2016 a new English-language translation of the novel Gerpla was published as Wayward Heroes. A new English-language translation of Salka Valka was released in 2022 to widespread acclaim.

Halldór Guðmundsson's book The Islander: A Biography of Halldór Laxness won the Icelandic Literary Prize for best work of non-fiction in 2004.

Numerous dramatic adaptations of Laxness's work have been staged in Iceland. In 2005, the Icelandic National Theatre premiered a play by Ólafur Haukur Símonarson, titled Halldór í Hollywood (Halldór in Hollywood) about the author's time spent in the United States in the 1920s.

A biennial Halldór Laxness International Literary Prize is awarded at the Reykjavík International Literary Festival.

Bibliography
Works by Laxness

Novels 
 1919: Barn náttúrunnar (Child of Nature)
 1924: Undir Helgahnúk (Under the Holy Mountain)
 1927: Vefarinn mikli frá Kasmír (The Great Weaver from Kashmir)
 1931: Þú vínviður hreini (O Thou Pure Vine) – Part I of Salka Valka
 1932: Fuglinn í fjörunni (The Bird on the Beach) – Part II of Salka Valka
 1933: Úngfrúin góða og Húsið (The Honour of the House), as part of Fótatak manna: sjö þættir
 1934: Sjálfstætt fólk — Part I, Landnámsmaður Íslands (Icelandic Pioneers),  Independent People
 1935: Sjálfstætt fólk – Part II, Erfiðir tímar (Hard Times), Independent People 
 1937: Ljós heimsins (The Light of the World) – Part I of Heimsljós (World Light)
 1938: Höll sumarlandsins (The Palace of the Summerland) – Part II of Heimsljós (World Light)
 1939: Hús skáldsins (The Poet's House) – Part III of Heimsljós (World Light)
 1940: Fegurð himinsins (The Beauty of the Skies) – Part IV of Heimsljós (World Light)
 1943: Íslandsklukkan (Iceland's Bell) – Part I of Íslandsklukkan (Iceland's Bell)
 1944: Hið ljósa man (The Bright Maiden) – Part II of  Íslandsklukkan (Iceland's Bell)
 1946: Eldur í Kaupinhafn (Fire in Copenhagen) – Part III of Íslandsklukkan (Iceland's Bell)
 1948: Atómstöðin (The Atom Station)
 1952: Gerpla (The Happy Warriors (1958) / Wayward Heroes (2016))
 1957: Brekkukotsannáll (The Fish Can Sing)
 1960: Paradísarheimt (Paradise Reclaimed)
 1968: Kristnihald undir Jökli (Under the Glacier / Christianity at the Glacier)
 1970: Innansveitarkronika (A Parish Chronicle)
 1972: Guðsgjafaþula (A Narration of God's Gifts)

Stories 
 1923: Nokkrar sögur
 1933: Fótatak manna
 1935: Þórður gamli halti
 1942: Sjö töframenn
 1954: Þættir (collection)
 1964: Sjöstafakverið
 1981: Við Heygarðshornið
 1987: Sagan af brauðinu dýra
 1992: Jón í Brauðhúsum
 1996: Fugl á garðstaurnum og fleiri smásögur
 1999: Úngfrúin góða og Húsið
 2000: Smásögur
 2001: Kórvilla á Vestfjörðum og fleiri sögur

Plays 
 1934: Straumrof
 1950: Snæfríður Íslandssól (from the novel Íslandsklukkan)
 1954: Silfurtúnglið
 1961: Strompleikurinn
 1962: Prjónastofan Sólin
 1966: Dúfnaveislan
 1970: Úa (from the novel Kristnihald undir Jökli)
 1972: Norðanstúlkan (from the novel Atómstöðin)

Poetry 
 1925: Únglíngurinn í skóginum
 1930: Kvæðakver

Travelogues and essays 
 1925: Kaþólsk viðhorf (Catholic View)
 1929: Alþýðubókin (The Book of the People)
 1933: Í Austurvegi (In the Baltic)
 1938: Gerska æfintýrið (The Russian Adventure)

Memoirs 
 1952: Heiman eg fór (subtitle: sjálfsmynd æskumanns)
 1975: Í túninu heima, part I
 1976: Úngur eg var, part II
 1978: Sjömeistarasagan, part III
 1980: Grikklandsárið, part IV
 1987: Dagar hjá múnkum

Translations 
 1941: Vopnin kvödd (A Farewell to Arms), Ernest Hemingway
 1943: Kirkjan á fjallinu (Kirken på bjerget), Gunnar Gunnarsson
 1945: Birtingur (Candide), Voltaire
 1966: Veisla í Farángrinum (A Moveable Feast), Ernest Hemingway

Other 
 1941: Laxdaela Saga, edited with preface 
 1942: Hrafnkatla, edited with preface
 1945: Brennunjal's Saga, edited with afterword
 1945: Alexander's Saga, edited with preface
 1946: Grettis Saga, edited with preface
 1952: Kvaedi og ritgerdir by Johann Jonsson, edited with preface

References

External links

 Gljúfrasteinn, the Halldór Laxness Museum website
  including the prize motivation
 
 Dennis Haarsager's biography 
  Laxness in Translation website

 
1902 births
1998 deaths
Halldor Laxness
Icelandic essayists
Halldor Laxness
Roman Catholic writers
Converts to Roman Catholicism from Lutheranism
Halldor Laxness
Nobel laureates in Literature
Halldor Laxness
Halldor Laxness
20th-century translators
Writers about the Soviet Union
20th-century Icelandic novelists
20th-century Roman Catholics
Deaths from dementia in Iceland
Deaths from Alzheimer's disease
Icelandic people with family names